Astronomical coordinate systems are organized arrangements for specifying positions of satellites, planets, stars, galaxies, and other celestial objects relative to physical reference points available to a situated observer (e.g. the true horizon and north cardinal direction to an observer situated on the Earth's surface). Coordinate systems in astronomy can specify an object's position in three-dimensional space or plot merely its direction on a celestial sphere, if the object's distance is unknown or trivial.

Spherical coordinates, projected on the celestial sphere, are analogous to the geographic coordinate system used on the surface of Earth. These differ in their choice of fundamental plane, which divides the celestial sphere into two equal hemispheres along a great circle. Rectangular coordinates, in appropriate units, have the same fundamental plane and primary (-axis) direction, such as a rotation axis. Each coordinate system is named after its choice of fundamental plane.

Coordinate systems 
The following table lists the common coordinate systems in use by the astronomical community. The fundamental plane divides the celestial sphere into two equal hemispheres and defines the baseline for the latitudinal coordinates, similar to the equator in the geographic coordinate system. The poles are located at ±90° from the fundamental plane. The primary direction is the starting point of the longitudinal coordinates. The origin is the zero distance point, the "center of the celestial sphere", although the definition of celestial sphere is ambiguous about the definition of its center point.

Horizontal system

The horizontal, or altitude-azimuth, system is based on the position of the observer on Earth, which revolves around its own axis once per sidereal day (23 hours, 56 minutes and 4.091 seconds) in relation to the star background. The positioning of a celestial object by the horizontal system varies with time, but is a useful coordinate system for locating and tracking objects for observers on Earth.  It is based on the position of stars relative to an observer's ideal horizon.

Equatorial system

The equatorial coordinate system is centered at Earth's center, but fixed relative to the celestial poles and the March equinox. The coordinates are based on the location of stars relative to Earth's equator if it were projected out to an infinite distance.  The equatorial describes the sky as seen from the Solar System, and modern star maps almost exclusively use equatorial coordinates.

The equatorial system is the normal coordinate system for most professional and many amateur astronomers having an equatorial mount that follows the movement of the sky during the night. Celestial objects are found by adjusting the telescope's or other instrument's scales so that they match the equatorial coordinates of the selected object to observe.

Popular choices of pole and equator are the older B1950 and the modern J2000 systems, but a pole and equator "of date" can also be used, meaning one appropriate to the date under consideration, such as when a measurement of the position of a planet or spacecraft is made. There are also subdivisions into "mean of date" coordinates, which average out or ignore nutation, and "true of date," which include nutation.

Ecliptic system

The fundamental plane is the plane of the Earth's orbit, called the ecliptic plane.  There are two principal variants of the ecliptic coordinate system: geocentric ecliptic coordinates centered on the Earth and heliocentric ecliptic coordinates centered on the center of mass of the Solar System.

The geocentric ecliptic system was the principal coordinate system for ancient astronomy and is still useful for computing the apparent motions of the Sun, Moon, and planets.

The heliocentric ecliptic system describes the planets' orbital movement around the Sun, and centers on the barycenter of the Solar System (i.e. very close to the center of the Sun). The system is primarily used for computing the positions of planets and other Solar System bodies, as well as defining their orbital elements.

Galactic system

The galactic coordinate system uses the approximate plane of our galaxy as its fundamental plane.  The Solar System is still the center of the coordinate system, and the zero point is defined as the direction towards the galactic center. Galactic latitude resembles the elevation above the galactic plane and galactic longitude determines direction relative to the center of the galaxy.

Supergalactic system

The supergalactic coordinate system corresponds to a fundamental plane that contains a higher than average number of local galaxies in the sky as seen from Earth.

Converting coordinates 

Conversions between the various coordinate systems are given. See the notes before using these equations.

Notation 
Horizontal coordinates
 , azimuth
 , altitude
Equatorial coordinates
 , right ascension
 , declination
 , hour angle
Ecliptic coordinates
 , ecliptic longitude
 , ecliptic latitude
Galactic coordinates
 , galactic longitude
 , galactic latitude
Miscellaneous
 , observer's longitude
 , observer's latitude
 , obliquity of the ecliptic (about 23.4°)
 , local sidereal time
 , Greenwich sidereal time

Hour angle ↔ right ascension

Equatorial ↔ ecliptic 
The classical equations, derived from spherical trigonometry, for the longitudinal coordinate are presented to the right of a bracket; dividing the first equation by the second gives the convenient tangent equation seen on the left.  The rotation matrix equivalent is given beneath each case. This division is ambiguous because tan has a period of 180° whereas cos and sin have periods of 360° (2).

Equatorial ↔ horizontal 
Azimuth is measured from the south point, turning positive to the west.
Zenith distance, the angular distance along the great circle from the zenith to a celestial object, is simply the complementary angle of the altitude: .

Thus, consistent with the convention of azimuth being measured from the south and opening positive to the west,
,

where
.

Thus, again consistent with the convention of azimuth being measured from the south and opening positive to the west,
 ,

where

Equatorial ↔ galactic 
These equations are for converting equatorial coordinates to Galactic coordinates.

Referred to J2000.0 the values of these quantities are:
 

If the equatorial coordinates are referred to another equinox, they must be precessed to their place at J2000.0 before applying these formulae.

These equations convert to equatorial coordinates referred to B2000.0.

Notes on conversion 

 Angles in the degrees ( ° ), minutes ( ′ ), and seconds ( ″ ) of sexagesimal measure must be converted to decimal before calculations are performed. Whether they are converted to decimal degrees or radians depends upon the particular calculating machine or program.
 Angles in the hours ( h ), minutes ( m ), and seconds ( s ) of time measure must be converted to decimal degrees or radians before calculations are performed. 1h = 15°; 1m = 15′; 1s = 15″
 Angles greater than 360° (2) or less than 0° may need to be reduced to the range 0°−360° (0–2) depending upon the particular calculating machine or program.
 The cosine of a latitude (declination, ecliptic and Galactic latitude, and altitude) are never negative by definition, since the latitude varies between −90° and +90°.
 Inverse trigonometric functions arcsine, arccosine and arctangent are quadrant-ambiguous, and results should be carefully evaluated. An equation which finds the sine, followed by the arcsin function, is recommended when calculating latitude/declination/altitude.
 Azimuth is referred here to the south point of the horizon, the common astronomical reckoning. An object on the meridian to the south of the observer has  =  = 0° with this usage. However, n Astropy's AltAz, in the Large Binocular Telescope FITS file convention, in XEphem, in the IAU library Standards of Fundamental Astronomy and Section B of the Astronomical Almanac for example, the azimuth is East of North.  In navigation and some other disciplines, azimuth is figured from the north.
 The equations for altitude do not account for atmospheric refraction.
 The equations for horizontal coordinates do not account for diurnal parallax, that is, the small offset in the position of a celestial object caused by the position of the observer on the Earth's surface. This effect is significant for the Moon, less so for the planets, minute for stars or more distant objects.
 Observer's longitude here is measured positively westward from the prime meridian; this is contrary to current IAU standards.

See also
Apparent longitude

Notes

References

External links

 NOVAS, the United States Naval Observatory's Vector Astrometry Software, an integrated package of subroutines and functions for computing various commonly needed quantities in positional astronomy.
 SOFA, the IAU's Standards of Fundamental Astronomy, an accessible and authoritative set of algorithms and procedures that implement standard models used in fundamental astronomy.
 This article was originally based on Jason Harris' Astroinfo, which comes along with KStars, a KDE Desktop Planetarium for Linux/KDE.

 
Astronomy
Cartography
Navigation
Concepts in astronomy